Kathryn Ryan is a New Zealand radio journalist. Ryan initially trained as a teacher, completing a BA in education and history. She then worked managing a sports centre, and retrained as a journalist in her late 20s. She began her journalism career in Napier, working on the local newspaper The Daily Telegraph. In 1998 she moved to Wellington and joined Radio New Zealand as a senior reporter, and in 2000 became the political editor. In May 2006 she started hosting Nine to Noon, Radio New Zealand's morning news programme.

In 2015 Ryan was named International Radio Personality of the Year by the Association of International Broadcasters.

References

New Zealand journalists
New Zealand radio journalists
New Zealand women journalists
New Zealand radio presenters
New Zealand women radio presenters
Living people
20th-century births
Year of birth missing (living people)